The Hôtel Pesciolini is a hôtel particulier in the 1st arrondissement of Marseille, France. It has been listed as an official historical monument since March 8, 1929.

References

Houses completed in 1673
Pesciolini
Monuments historiques of Marseille
1673 establishments in France